Anja von Rekowski (born 13 December 1975 in Celle) is a German former judoka who competed in the 1996 Summer Olympics and in the 2000 Summer Olympics.

References

1975 births
Living people
German female judoka
Olympic judoka of Germany
Judoka at the 1996 Summer Olympics
Judoka at the 2000 Summer Olympics
People from Celle
Sportspeople from Lower Saxony
20th-century German women